The World Eskimo-Indian Olympics (or WEIO) is an annual multi-sport event held over a four-day period beginning the 3rd Wednesday each July, designed to preserve cultural practices and traditional (survival) skills essential to life in circumpolar areas of the world. The WEIO features games or sports rooted in ancestral hunting and survival techniques employed by the Inuit, Iñupiat, Yupik, and other Native Americans, as well as dance storytelling competitions, and an annual cultural pageant, called Miss WEIO, that focuses on cultural knowledge.

History
WEIO began in 1961 as the World Eskimo Olympics and was initially held on the banks of the Chena River in downtown Fairbanks, Alaska, in conjunction with the Golden Days celebration festivities. The event was sponsored by the City of Fairbanks, through the city's Chamber of Commerce. 

In 1970, sponsorship of the event was transferred to the statewide newspaper Tundra Times and several revisions were made. This includes the name change – which inserted "Indian" to better reflect the ethnicity of the participants – and the introduction of events for women.  The first decade of the events featured male-only participants; eventually, the number of events with women competing increased. Women now participate in some of the more arduous events, including ear pulls and high kicks.

Six years later, WEIO reorganized as a 501(c) non-profit organization, which took over sponsorship from the newspaper, and has been responsible for plans, preparations, and stagings related to the event.

After four and a half decades in Fairbanks, the games were relocated to Anchorage, Alaska in 2007 following a successful bid to host the event. WEIO board members were concerned that Fairbanks officials were becoming complacent, and elected to examine other venues.

The organization's general assembly voted to have the games held at the new location earlier that spring.

The event in Anchorage proved to be too costly and the games have not returned since. Fairbanks is recognized as WEIO's permanent home.

In 2018, WEIO introduced a new logo designed by Yu'pik artist Aassanaaq Ossie Kairaiuak, who is better known as a member of the band Pamyua. The new design was chosen because it better exemplifies the cultural roots of the organization. It is now included on WEIO's website, weio.org and Facebook page.

The 2020 WEIO event was canceled due the COVID-19 pandemic. The 2021 (60th Anniversary) WEIO Games are scheduled for July 21–24, 2021 at the Big Dipper Ice Arena in Fairbanks, Alaska, with the opening ceremonies featuring PBS Kids character Molly of Denali.

Events

Events played at the WEIO are either traditional or everyday tasks unique to Eskimo or northern native culture:

 Knuckle hop or seal hop
 Four man carry
 Ear weight
 Ear pull
 Drop the bomb
 One foot high kick and akratcheak (two foot high kick)
 One hand reach
 Alaskan high kick
 Kneel jump
 Indian stick pull
 Eskimo stick pull (tug of war)
 Toe kick
 Arm pull
 Nalukataq (blanket toss)
 Seal skinning
 Maktak eating
 Greased pole walk
 Bench reach

See also
Arctic Winter Games

References

External links

 
 "History of the World Eskimo-Indian Olympics", Fairbanks-Alaska.com.
McNeel, Jack (2003). 
Block, Melissa (2007). Eskimo-Indian Olympics Capture Native Traditions as covered by the NPR programme, All Things Considered

1961 establishments in Alaska
Alaska Native culture in Fairbanks
Annual events in Alaska
Culture of Fairbanks, Alaska
Eskimo culture
Multi-sport events
Non-profit organizations based in Fairbanks, Alaska
Recurring sporting events established in 1961
Sport in the Arctic
Sports competitions in Alaska
Sports in Fairbanks, Alaska